Glenea extensa is a species of beetle in the family Cerambycidae. It was described by Francis Polkinghorne Pascoe in 1858. It is known from Borneo and Malaysia.

Varietas
 Glenea extensa var. bipunctulipennis Breuning, 1958
 Glenea extensa var. jubaea Pascoe, 1866
 Glenea extensa var. mima J. Thomson, 1865

References

extensa
Beetles described in 1858